Kamran Imanov Sultan oglu is an Azerbaijani politician who serves as the Chairman of Board of Intellectual Property Agency of the Republic of Azerbaijan.

Early life
Imanov has graduated with a master's degree in Information Technology and is a PhD of Management. He has held various positions from Director of Scientific Research Institute to rector of a university, chairman of the State Students Admission Commission on Test Exams and manager of Icheri Sheher. Imanov also works as a professor at Azerbaijan Architecture and Construction University and Western University in Baku.

Political career
Kamran Imanov worked as the Chairman of the State Copyright Agency of the Republic of Azerbaijan in 1995–2006. He was re-appointed to the same position in November 2008 government reshuffle.

Works
Imanov has authored more than 450 publications, including about 120 scientific works on intellectual property and protection of intangible heritage.

Books
 "Армянские ина(о)родные сказки", Bakı, 2008.

See also
Cabinet of Azerbaijan

References 

Living people
Government ministers of Azerbaijan
Year of birth missing (living people)